In enzymology, a D-lysopine dehydrogenase is an enzyme that catalyzes the chemical reaction

N2-(D-1-carboxyethyl)-L-lysine + NADP+ + H2O  L-lysine + pyruvate + NADPH + H+

The 3 substrates of this enzyme are N2-(D-1-carboxyethyl)-L-lysine, NADP+, and H2O, whereas its 4 products are L-lysine, pyruvate, NADPH, and H+.

This enzyme belongs to the family of oxidoreductases, specifically those acting on the CH-NH group of donors with NAD+ or NADP+ as acceptor.  The systematic name of this enzyme class is N2-(D-1-carboxyethyl)-L-lysine:NADP+ oxidoreductase (L-lysine-forming). Other names in common use include D-lysopine synthase, lysopine dehydrogenase, D(+)-lysopine dehydrogenase, 2-N-(D-1-carboxyethyl)-L-lysine:NADP+ oxidoreductase, and (L-lysine-forming).  This enzyme participates in lysine degradation.

References

 

EC 1.5.1
NADPH-dependent enzymes
Enzymes of unknown structure